Jack Henderson may refer to:

Jack Henderson (actor) (1877–1957), American silent movie actor
Jack Henderson (author) (born 1958), American thriller writer
Jack Henderson (canoeist) (1914–?), British sprint canoeist
Jack Henderson (artist) (born 2004), Scottish artist
Jack Henderson (footballer) (1844–1932), Irish footballer

See also 
John Henderson (disambiguation)
Henderson (surname)